Tanzi District is a suburban district with a population 108,761 as of February 2023, located north of Taichung, Taiwan. It has an area of 25.8497 km2.

Administrative divisions 

Tanxiu, Tanbei, Tanyang, Furen, Toujia, Toujiatung, Jiaxing, Jiafu, Ganzhe, Tungbao, Dafu, Dafeng, Lilin, Jiaren, Xintian and Juxing Village.

Economy 
Taichung Tanzi Export Processing Zone is located in the township, providing a variety of employment opportunities.

Hospital 
Created by Tzu Chi in 2007.

Native products 
 Rice
 oranges

Education 
 Haiwen Middle School
 Ivy Collegiate Academy
 Sintian Mountain
 Hongwen High School

Tourist attractions 
 Zhaixing Villa

Transportation 

 Lilin Station
 Tanzi Station
 Toujiacuo Station

References 

Districts of Taichung